La Tête et les Jambes is a French game show which was broadcast from October 20 1960  to September 15 1975 to June 26 1978. It was created by Jacques Antoine in 1957 as a sequence in the show Télé Match, it was presented by Pierre Bellemare.

Principle of the game show

The game combines two competitors: a competitor ("the head") has to answer complex questions on a specific topic. In a case of failure, a high-level competitor ("legs"), must catch up with their opponent by performing a minimum performance to allow him to stay in the game.

If one competitor reaches the end of the 24 questions (6 questions per week for 4 weeks), they will earn 100,000 francs.

Bibliography
Michel Drucker et Gilles Verlant, Les 500 Émissions mythiques de la télévision française,  Coll. Histoire et Act, Flammarion, 2012

References

External links

1960 French television series debuts
1978 French television series endings
French game shows
French-language television shows